In machine learning, a probabilistic classifier is a classifier that is able to predict, given an observation of an input, a probability distribution over a set of classes, rather than only outputting the most likely class that the observation should belong to. Probabilistic classifiers provide classification that can be useful in its own right or when combining classifiers into ensembles.

Types of classification
Formally, an "ordinary" classifier is some rule, or function, that assigns to a sample  a class label :

The samples come from some set  (e.g., the set of all documents, or the set of all images), while the class labels form a finite set  defined prior to training.

Probabilistic classifiers generalize this notion of classifiers: instead of functions, they are conditional distributions , meaning that for a given , they assign probabilities to all  (and these probabilities sum to one). "Hard" classification can then be done using the optimal decision rule

or, in English, the predicted class is that which has the highest probability.

Binary probabilistic classifiers are also called binary regression models in statistics. In econometrics, probabilistic classification in general is called discrete choice.

Some classification models, such as naive Bayes, logistic regression and multilayer perceptrons (when trained under an appropriate loss function) are naturally probabilistic. Other models such as support vector machines are not, but methods exist to turn them into probabilistic classifiers.

Generative and conditional training
Some models, such as logistic regression, are conditionally trained: they optimize the conditional probability  directly on a training set (see empirical risk minimization). Other classifiers, such as naive Bayes, are trained generatively: at training time, the class-conditional distribution  and the class prior  are found, and the conditional distribution  is derived using Bayes' rule.

Probability calibration
Not all classification models are naturally probabilistic, and some that are, notably naive Bayes classifiers, decision trees and boosting methods, produce distorted class probability distributions.  In the case of decision trees, where  is the proportion of training samples with label  in the leaf where  ends up, these distortions come about because learning algorithms such as C4.5 or CART explicitly aim to produce homogeneous leaves (giving probabilities close to zero or one, and thus high bias) while using few samples to estimate the relevant proportion (high variance).  

 Calibration can be assessed using a calibration plot (also called a reliability diagram).  A calibration plot shows the proportion of items in each class for bands of predicted probability or score (such as a distorted probability distribution or the "signed distance to the hyperplane" in a support vector machine).  Deviations from the identity function indicate a poorly-calibrated classifier for which the predicted probabilities or scores can not be used as probabilities.  In this case one can use a method to turn these scores into properly calibrated class membership probabilities.

For the binary case, a common approach is to apply Platt scaling, which learns a logistic regression model on the scores.
An alternative method using isotonic regression is generally superior to Platt's method when sufficient training data is available.

In the multiclass case, one can use a reduction to binary tasks, followed by univariate calibration with an algorithm as described above and further application of the pairwise coupling algorithm by Hastie and Tibshirani.

Evaluating probabilistic classification
Commonly used loss functions for probabilistic classification include log loss and the Brier score between the predicted and the true probability distributions. The former of these is commonly used to train logistic models.

A method used to assign scores to pairs of predicted probabilities and actual discrete outcomes, so that different predictive methods can be compared, is called a scoring rule.

Software Implementations
 MoRPE is a trainable probabilistic classifier that uses isotonic regression for probability calibration.  It solves the multiclass case by reduction to binary tasks.  It is a type of kernel machine that uses an inhomogeneous polynomial kernel.

References

Probabilistic models
Statistical classification